Natividade (meaning the nativity) is a municipality (município) in the state of Tocantins in Brazil. The estimated population in 2020 was 9,250, the area is 3,240 km². The elevation is 323 m.

References

Municipalities in Tocantins